Dreamy may refer to:

Albums
Dreamy (Beat Happening album), 1991
Dreamy (Sarah Vaughan album), 1960

Songs
"Dreamy", an oft-covered jazz song by Erroll Garner
"Dreamy", a song in the 1972 comedy film The Return of the Pink Panther
"Dreamy", a 1982 song on A Distant Shore (album) by Tracey Thorn

Television
"Dreamy" (Once Upon a Time), an episode of the American drama series

See also
 Dream (disambiguation)
Dreamies, a 1974 collage album, an early use of sampling
 Oneiric (disambiguation)